Rae Armantrout (born April 13, 1947) is an American poet generally associated with the Language poets. She has published ten books of poetry and has also been featured in a number of major anthologies. Armantrout currently teaches at the University of California, San Diego, where she is Professor of Poetry and Poetics.
Armantrout was awarded the 2009 National Book Critics Circle Award for her book Versed published by the Wesleyan University Press, which had also been nominated for the National Book Award.<ref>"Faculty poet honored for new collection", Aricleant</ref> The book later received the 2010 Pulitzer Prize for Poetry.  She is the recipient of numerous awards for her poetry, including an award in poetry from the Foundation for Contemporary Arts in 2007 and a Guggenheim Fellowship in 2008.

Early life
Armantrout was born in Vallejo, California. An only child, she was raised among military communities on naval bases, predominantly in San Diego. In her autobiography True (1998), she describes herself as having endured an insular childhood, a sensitive child of working class, Methodist fundamentalist parents. In 1965, whilst living in the Allied Gardens district with her parents, Armantrout attended San Diego State University, intending to major in anthropology. During her studies she transferred to English and American literature, later studying at the University of California, Berkeley. At Berkeley, she studied with poet Denise Levertov and befriended Ron Silliman, who would become involved with the Language poets of late 1980s San Francisco.  Armantrout graduated from Berkeley in 1970 and married Chuck Korkegian in 1971, whom she had dated since her first year of university.

Literary career
Armantrout published poetry in Caterpillar and from this point began to view herself as a poet. She took a master's degree in creative writing from San Francisco State University, and wrote Extremities (1978), her first book of poetry.

Armantrout was a member of the original West Coast Language group. Although Language poetry can be seen as advocating a poetics of nonreferentiality, Armantrout's work, focusing as it often does on the local and the domestic, resists such definitions. However, unlike most of the group, her work is firmly grounded in experience of the local and domestic worlds and she is widely regarded as the most lyrical of the Language Poets.

Critic Stephanie Burt at the Boston Review commented:  "William Carlos Williams and Emily Dickinson together taught Armantrout how to dismantle and reassemble the forms of stanzaic lyric— how to turn it inside out and backwards, how to embody large questions and apprehensions in the conjunctions of individual words, how to generate productive clashes from arrangements of small groups of phrases. From these techniques, Armantrout has become one of the most recognizable, and one of the best, poets of her generation".  As Burt noted, and as Armantrout herself acknowledges, her writing was significantly influenced by reading William Carlos Williams, whom she credits with developing her "sense of the line" and her understanding that "line breaks can create suspense and can destabilize meaning through delay." The basic unit of meaning in Armantrout's poetry is either the stanza or the section, and she writes both prose poetry and more traditional stanza-based poems. In a conversation with poet, novelist, and critic Ben Lerner for BOMB Magazine, Armantrout said that she is more likely to write a prose poem "when [she] hear[s] the voice of a conventional narrator in [her] head."

Armantrout's poems have appeared in many anthologies, including In The American Tree (National Poetry Foundation), Language Poetries (New Directions), Postmodern American Poetry: A Norton Anthology, From the Other Side of the Century (Sun & Moon), Out of Everywhere (Reality Street), American Women Poets in the 21st Century: Where Language Meets the Lyric Tradition, (Wesleyan, 2002), The Oxford Book of American Poetry (Oxford, UP, 2006) and The Best American Poetry of 1988, 2001, 2002, 2004 and 2007.

Armantrout has twice received a Fund For Poetry Grant and was a California Arts Council Fellowship recipient in 1989. In 2007 she was awarded a grant from the Foundation for Contemporary Arts Grants to Artists Award. She is currently one of ten poets working on a project entitled The Grand Piano: An Experiment In Collective Autobiography.  Writing on the volume began in 1998 and the first volume (of a proposed ten) was published in November 2006, and thereafter in three-month intervals.Wobble, published in November 2018, was a finalist for the 2018 National Book Award for Poetry.

Bibliography

Poetry
Collections
 
 
 
 1991: Necromance (Sun and Moon Press)
 1991: Couverture (Les Cahiers de Royaumont) -  a selection in French translation
 1995: Made To Seem (Sun and Moon Press)
 2001: Veil: New and Selected Poems (Wesleyan University Press)
 2001: The Pretext (Green Integer)
 2004: Up to Speed (Wesleyan University Press)
 2007: Next Life (Wesleyan University Press)
 2009: Versed (Wesleyan University Press) - 2010 Pulitzer Prize for Poetry
 2011: Money Shot (Wesleyan University Press)
 2013: Just Saying (Wesleyan University Press)
 2015: Itself (Wesleyan University Press)
 2016: Partly: New and Selected Poems, 2001-2015 (Wesleyan University Press)
 2018: Wobble (Wesleyan University Press)
Chapbooks
 1998: writing the plot about sets (Chax)
 2016: Currency (Yale Union)
 2017: Entanglements (Wesleyan University Press) 
List of poems

ProseTrue (Atelos, 1998) - memoir; republished in Collected ProseThe Grand Piano: An Experiment In Collective Autobiography (with Bob Perelman, Barrett Watten, Steve Benson, Carla Harryman, Tom Mandel, Ron Silliman, Kit Robinson, Lyn Hejinian, and Ted Pearson) (Mode A/This Press, 2007)Collected Prose (Singing Horse Press, 2007); 

TranslationsNarrativ [English-German, Bilingual edition, translated by Uda Strätling and Martin Göritz] (Luxbooks, Wiesbaden, 2009)

References

Further readingA Wild Salience: the Writing of Rae Armantrout (Burning Press, 2000) — featuring essays and poems on or inspired by her work including pieces by Robert Creeley, Susan Wheeler, Hank Lazer, Bob Perelman, Lydia Davis, Lyn Hejinian, Rachel Blau DuPlessis, Ron Silliman, Brenda Hillman, Fanny Howe and othersA Suite of Poetic Voices: "Interview" (with Manuel Brito), (Santa Brigada, Spain: Kadle Books, 1994)

External links
Biography from the International Literature Festival Berlin
Rae Armantrout Papers at Stanford
The UCSD Register of Rae Armantrout Papers, 1954-2009
Rae Armantrout profile at the Academy of American Poets
Profile at Green Integer"Cosmology and Me", essay by Armantrout at Jacket)
Interview with Armantrout (Audio), PBS NewsHour, April 19, 2010. Includes poems and transcript.
Interview in BOMB Magazine. Winter 2011
Armantrout resources at PENNSound
Armantrout interviewed on Bookworm at KCRW, February 26, 2009
Armantrout at the University of Chicago gives a talk on the lyric poem (March 2011).
"The (Pulitzer-Winning) Poet is a Quilter. The Poet is a Collector. The Poet is 62", at Women's voices for change'' April 14, 2010
Interview in Spanish magazine Jot Down, March 2012
On Poetry and Complexity - Conversation with Madhur Anand, Roald Hoffman, and Sarah Tolmie 

Living people
1947 births
20th-century American poets
20th-century American women writers
21st-century American poets
21st-century American women writers
American women poets
Language poets
Poets from California
Pulitzer Prize for Poetry winners
The New Yorker people
University of California, San Diego faculty
San Francisco State University alumni
Writers from Vallejo, California